Gun, also spelled Geon, Kŏn, Keon, Gon, Kuhn, or Kun, is a single-syllable masculine Korean given name, as well as an element in some two-syllable given names. The meaning differs based on the hanja used to write it.

Hanja
There are 15 hanja with this reading, and variant forms of two of those, on the South Korean government's official list of hanja which may be used in given names; they are:

: "to construct"
 (variant)
: "sky"
(): "dry"
 (variant)
: "object", "matter"
: "strong"
: "towel"
: "respect"
: "door latch"
: "key"
: "error"
: "sinew"
: "cripple"
: "wane"
: "to pick"
: name of a body of water
: "follow"

People
People with this name include:
Yi Geon (1909–1990), prince of the Korean Empire, later a naturalised Japanese citizen
Kang Kon (1918–1950), Korean military leader in Northeast China
Goh Kun (born 1938), South Korean politician, Prime Minister from 1997 to 1998 and 2003 to 2004
Shin Kuhn (1941–2015), 25th director of South Korea's National Intelligence Service 
Cui Jian (born 1961), Chinese rock musician of Korean descent
Yoo Gun (born Jo Jeong-ik, 1983), American-born South Korean actor
Heo Keon (born 1988), South Korean football midfielder
Park Gon (born 1990), South Korean football defender
Lee Geon (footballer) (born 1996), South Korean football winger

As a name element
In the 2000s, one given name containing this element, Kun-woo, was a popular name for newborn baby boys in South Korea. Other given names containing this element include:
Dong-gun
Yoo-gun

See also
List of Korean given names

References

Korean given names
Korean masculine given names